Barahakshetra Municipality is a newly formed municipality located in Sunsari District of Province No. 1 in Nepal. The area of the municipality is 222 km2 and according to 2011 Census of Nepal the population of the municipality is 77,604 Barahakshetra is a famous pilgrimage site that remains inside Barahakshetra Municipality. Also saptakoshi River flows inside the Municipality.

Education
There are both government and non-government schools. There are about fifteen government and about fifteen non-government schools. Among them Shree Ja De Ja H.S.S is the oldest and reputed Government School in the Municipality and (Bharaul Bal Mandir and Shree Mahendra High school) are one of the oldest and reputed government school in the locality. Shiddhartha Memorial H.S.S, Morning Star School, Sunshine Secondary English Boarding School, Sunsari Garden Academy, Rajabas English Secondary School, Moon Beam Academy, The Sky Lab Academy (Bagjhora) and The Oxford School are some of the non-government schools among the municipality.

Climate
The weather in Barahakshetra Municipality is mostly hot.
Chakraghatti, Prakashpur (main town areas) experiences 6 seasons,

Barahachettra 
Barahachhetra is a Hindu pilgrimage site. Among 4  in Hindu mythology two fall in India and two in Nepal. That is Kurukshetra & Dharmachhetra in India and Barahachhetra & Muktinath or Muktichhetra in Nepal.

Lord Vishnu, by taking the incarnation of Varaha or Baraha protected the earth from being submerged into Patala (underworld) with his long tusk. Then the Lord sat with his wife Laxmi at the bank of Koshi River and the lap of Himalayas and hills. So, the place bore its name after that event. There is a big and beautiful image of the Baraha incarnation of Lord Vishnu.

Landmarks / Places of Interest

Koshi Tapu 
The Koshi Tappu Wildlife Reserve is a protected area in the Terai of eastern Nepal covering 175 km2 (68 sq mi) of wetlands in the Sunsari, Saptari and Udayapur Districts. It comprises extensive mudflats, reed beds, and freshwater marshes in the floodplain of the Sapta Kosi River, and ranges in elevation from 75 to 81 m (246 to 266 ft). It was established in 1976 and designated as a Ramsar site in December 1987. It hosts Nepal's last remaining herd of the wild water buffalo (Bubalus arnee)

Amha Wetland 
The Amha Wetland (अम्हा शिम्सर ) is natural pond (small lake) situated in Barahakshetra Municipality Ward No. 5, Sunsari. People can enjoy boating, greenery sight. It is famous Palace to Picnics and gathering.

Chanarmain Dhami Than

Chanarmain Dhami Than is one of the famous holy places is known as 'Shree Chanarmain Dhami Thaan' in Barahakshetra Municipality, wad no.-05, Kalabanjar beside of Police chauki. Every year, a great mela (fair) is conducted on 27th of Baisakh. People visiting this place for worship believe that Dhami Baba will end evil and bring prosperity.
Bharat Raj Dhami:-
General secretary
Shree Chanarmain Sangrakchhan Samitee.

References

Sunsari District
Municipalities in Koshi Province
Nepal municipalities established in 2017
Populated places in Sunsari District
Municipalities in Sunsari District